Don Francesco Maria Marescotti, Principe Ruspoli (March 5, 1672 – July 14, 1731) was the ?th Marchese and 1st Principe di Cerveteri, 1st Marchese di Riano and 6th Conte di Vignanello.

He was a son of Alessandro Ruspoli, 5th Conte di Vignanello and first wife Anna Maria dei Marchesi Corsini.

Also he was a paternal grandson of Sforza Vicino Marescotti, 4th Conte di Vignanello and wife Vittoria dei Principi Ruspoli dei Marchesi di Cerveteri (? – Rome, February 11, 1681).

His son was Bartolomeo Ruspoli.

Marriage and children 
He married Isabella Cesi dei Duchi di Acquasparta (1676 – November 10, 1753), maternal niece of Pope Innocent XIII, by whom he had nine children:

 Donna Isabella dei Principi Ruspoli (September 15, 1696 – ?), unmarried and without issue
 Bartolomeo Ruspoli
 Donna Giacinta Marescotti dei Principi Ruspoli (Rome, February 16, 1699 – Rome, November 14, 1757), married in 1718 Ferdinando Bernualdo Filippo Orsini, 5th Principe di Solofra and 14th Duca di Gravina (1685 – ?), and had issue
 Donna Vittoria dei Principi Ruspoli (May 17, 1700 – 1743), married Stefano Conti, ?th Duca di Poli and ?th Duca di Guadagnolo (? – 1763)
 Donna Margherita dei Principi Ruspoli (August 13, 1703 – ?), twin with her sister below, unmarried and without issue
 Donna Teresa dei Principi Ruspoli (August 13, 1703 – ?), twin with her sister above, unmarried and without issue
 Donna Anna dei Principi Ruspoli (October 18, 1704 – bef 1735), married in 1730 Agostino Chigi della Rovere, ?th Principe di Farnese (1710–1769)
 Donna Maria Angelica dei Principi Ruspoli (1707 – February 21, 1766), married on October 31, 1734 Girolamo Vincenzo IV Giustiniani, 4th Principe di Bassano and ?th Duca di Corbara (1714 – ?), and had issue
 Alessandro Ruspoli, 2nd Prince of Cerveteri

See also 
 Ruspoli.

External links 
 Francesco Maria Marescotti Ruspoli on a genealogical site

1672 births
1731 deaths
Francesco Maria Marescotti
Francesco Maria Marescotti
Nobility from Rome